is a public high school on Miyakejima. It is operated by the Tokyo Metropolitan Government Board of Education.

References

External links
 Miyake High School 

Tokyo Metropolitan Government Board of Education schools
High schools in Tokyo
Izu Islands